Adam Powell or Apowell (by 1496 – 5 March 1546), of Gloucester, was an English politician.

Family
Powell married a woman named Mary, and they had one daughter and two sons.

Career
He was a Member (MP) of the Parliament of England for Gloucester in 1529.

References

15th-century births
1546 deaths
People from Gloucester
Members of the Parliament of England (pre-1707) for Gloucester
English MPs 1529–1536